The 2012 Mito HollyHock season sees Mito HollyHock compete in J.League Division 2 for the 13th consecutive season and 15th second-tier season overall. Mito HollyHock are also competing in the 2012 Emperor's Cup.

Players

Competitions

J. League

League table

Matches

Emperor's Cup

References

Mito HollyHock
Mito HollyHock seasons